María Errázuriz Echaurren (1861 – 1 May 1922) was First Lady of Chile and the wife of President Germán Riesco Errázuriz.

She was born in Santiago, the daughter of President Federico Errázuriz Zañartu and former First Lady Eulogia Echaurren García-Huidobro, and sister of President Federico Errázuriz Echaurren. On 7 January 1880, she married Germán Riesco, her first cousin via her father's sister, Carlota Errázuriz Zañartu. The couple had eight children together, including Germán Ignacio Riesco Errázuriz, a twice-appointed Minister of Chile.

References

External links
Genealogical chart of Errázuriz family 

M
People from Santiago
Chilean people of Basque descent
First ladies of Chile
1861 births
1922 deaths